This article contains information about the literary events and publications of 1807.

Events
January – Heinrich von Kleist sets out for Dresden, but is arrested by the French as a spy and kept a prisoner for six months at Châlons-sur-Marne.
January 24 – Washington Irving launches the satirical magazine Salmagundi in New York City.
June 24 – The Tout-Paris assist in the first production of the Panorama de Momus, a vaudeville by Marc-Antoine Désaugiers.
July 13 – Heinrich von Kleist is released from prison in France.
unknown dates
The first edition of The Family Shakspeare, an expurgated edition of Shakespeare's plays under the nominal editorship of Thomas Bowdler, but probably compiled mostly by his sister Henrietta Maria Bowdler, appears in London.
The first facsimile edition of the Shakespeare First Folio, edited by Francis Douce, is published in London by Edward and Joseph Wright.
Benjamin Tabart in London publishes the first printed version of The History of Jack and the Bean-Stalk.
Charles Wiley founds a print shop in Manhattan, which eventually grows into the John Wiley & Sons book publishing group.

New books

Fiction
Harriet Butler – Count Eugenio
Charlotte Dacre – The Libertine
Germaine de Staël – Corinne, ou l'Italie
Elizabeth Gunning – The Orphans of Snowdon
Rachel Hunter – Family Annals
William Henry Ireland – The Catholic
Charles and Mary Lamb – Tales from Shakespeare
Matthew Gregory Lewis – The Wood Daemon
P. D. Manville – Lucinda
Charles Maturin – The Fatal Revenge
Mary Meeke – Julien
Mary Pilkington – Ellen: Heiress of the Castle
Anna Maria Porter – The Hungarian Brothers
Regina Marie Roche – The Discarded Son
Anne Louise Germaine de Stael – Corinne
Sarah Wilkinson – The Castle Spectre

Drama
Thomas John Dibdin – Pantomimes:
Harlequin in his Element
Mother Goose
Giovanni Giraud – Gelosie per equivoco
William Godwin – Faulkener
Sophia Lee – The Assignation
Matthew Lewis – Adelgitha
 Thomas Morton – Town and Country
John Tobin –  The Curfew

Poetry
James Hogg – The Mountain Bard
William Wordsworth – Poems in Two Volumes

Non-fiction
Antoine Alexandre Barbier – Dictionnaire des ouvrages anonymes et pseudonymes
Jacob Boehme – Quarante Questions sur l'âme (translated into French by Louis Claude de Saint-Martin)
Georg Wilhelm Friedrich Hegel -The Phenomenology of Spirit (Phänomenologie des Geistes)
Gottlieb Hufeland – New Foundations of Political Economy
Alexander von Humboldt – Voyage aux régions équinoxiales du nouveau continent 1799–1804
Thomas Paine – The Age of Reason
Germaine de Staël – Corinne, ou l'Italie

Births
January 28 – Sophie Bolander, Swedish novelist (died 1869)
February 27 – Henry Wadsworth Longfellow, American poet (died 1882)
June 30 – Friedrich Theodor Vischer, German author (died 1887)
August 31 – Thomas Miller, English "ploughman poet" and novelist (died 1874)
September 2 – Fredrika Runeberg, Finnish novelist and journalist (died 1879)
September 9 – Richard Chenevix Trench, Anglo-Irish Anglican archbishop and poet (died 1886)
October 23 – Jemima von Tautphoeus, née Montgomery, Anglo-Irish-born novelist (died 1893)
October 30 – Christopher Wordsworth, English Anglican bishop and Biblical scholar (died 1885)
November 16 – Jónas Hallgrímsson, Icelandic poet (died 1845)

Deaths
January 5 – Isaac Reed, English Shakespearean editor (born 1742)
February 18 – Sophie von La Roche, German novelist (born 1730)
June 14 – Louis Bruyas, French dramatist and actor (born 1738)
July 24 – John Christopher Kunze, American theologian (born 1744)
August 1 – John Walker, English lexicographer (born 1732)
December 3 – Clara Reeve, English novelist and literary historian (born 1729)
December 19 – Friedrich Melchior, baron von Grimm, German-born French memoirist and literary correspondent (born 1723)
December 21 – John Newton, English hymnist (born 1725)

References

 
Years of the 19th century in literature